Joseph Eccles (February 1906 – 1970) was an English footballer who played in the Football League for Aston Villa and Northampton Town. His father Jack was also a professional footballer.

References

1906 births
1970 deaths
English footballers
English Football League players
Walsall F.C. players
Aston Villa F.C. players
West Ham United F.C. players
Northampton Town F.C. players
Coventry City F.C. players
Association football wingers